Ehrengard Melusine von der Schulenburg, Duchess of Kendal, Duchess of Munster (25 December 166710 May 1743) was a longtime mistress to King George I of Great Britain.

Early life
She was born at Emden in the Duchy of Magdeburg. She was a daughter of Gustavus Adolphus, Baron von der Schulenburg, Privy Councillor to the Elector of Brandenburg, by his wife Petronella Ottilie von Schwencken and a sister to Federic Achatius, Count von der Schulenburg and Hehlen.  Her brother was Marshal Johann Matthias von der Schulenburg. Her middle name was probably given in reference to the Melusine legends.

Royal mistress

Once a Maid of Honour to Electress Sophia, she became a mistress of the Electoral Prince, George Louis. George Louis succeeded as Elector of Hanover in 1698 and King of Great Britain (as George I) in 1714.

Melusine moved with him to England, and on 18 July 1716 was created for life Duchess of Munster, Marchioness of Dungannon, Countess of Dungannon and Baroness Dundalk, in the Peerage of Ireland. On 19 March 1719 she was further created Duchess of Kendal, Countess of Feversham and Baroness Glastonbury, in the Peerage of Great Britain. In 1723 Charles VI, Holy Roman Emperor, created her Princess of Eberstein. This last creation in particular tended to support the theory that she had married the King in secret. Robert Walpole  said of her that she was "as much the queen of England as anyone was". George's wife Sophia had been kept in imprisonment since their divorce in 1694.

The Duchess of Kendal was a very thin woman, being known in Germany as "the Scarecrow" and in England as "the Maypole". The Jacobites called her "the Goose", most famously in the taunting Scots ballad Cam Ye O'er Frae France. When in England, she lived principally at Kendal House in Isleworth, Middlesex. She obtained large sums of money by selling public offices and titles; she also sold patent rights, including the privilege of supplying Ireland with a new copper coinage. This she sold to William Wood, a Wolverhampton merchant, who flooded the country with inferior coins, leading Jonathan Swift to write his Drapier's Letters. In political matters, she had much influence with the king, and she received £10,000 (£ in ) for procuring the recall of Viscount Bolingbroke from exile.

Melusine bore George three illegitimate children:
Anna Luise Sophie von der Schulenburg, Countess of Dölitz (1692–1773), who married Ernest August Philipp von dem Bussche-Ippenburg.
Petronilla Melusina von der Schulenburg (1693–1778), who married Philip Stanhope, 4th Earl of Chesterfield, a leading Whig politician.
 Margarethe Gertrud von Oeynhausen (1701–1726), who married Albrecht Wolfgang, Count of Schaumburg-Lippe.

Luise Sophie and Petronilla Melusina were officially acknowledged as the children of Melusine's sister Gertrud (1659–1697) and her husband Friedrich Achaz von der Schulenburg (1647–1701), a kinsman of the sisters who shared their surname. Margarethe Gertrud was officially named von Oeynhausen because she was recognised as the daughter of Melusine's other sister, Sophia Juliane von Oeynhausen (1668–1755).

Later life and death
After George's death, she kept a raven she believed to be the dead king. She died, unmarried (unless George I had wedded her), on 10 May 1743.

See also
English royal mistress

References

External links

1667 births
1743 deaths
People from Börde (district)
Melusine
Mistresses of British royalty
German baronesses
British duchesses
Life peeresses created by George I
17th-century German people
18th-century German people
17th-century German women
18th-century German women
18th-century English women
18th-century English people
Munster
Dukes in the Peerage of Great Britain
British maids of honour
Emigrants from the Holy Roman Empire to Great Britain
Schulenburg family